Rillito is a census-designated place (CDP) in Pima County, Arizona, United States, surrounded by the town of Marana. The largest business in the community is Arizona Portland Cement and the community has had a post office since the 1920s. There is a regional park and recreation center (Rillito Vista Community Center) in the middle of the community. Rillito has the ZIP Code of 85654; in 2000, the population of the 85654 ZCTA was 148.

Demographics

See also

 List of census-designated places in Arizona

References

Further reading
 Dex Official Directory for Tucson Arizona, p. 47, s.v. Pima County Parks and Recreation Dept.

External links

Census-designated places in Pima County, Arizona
Populated places in the Sonoran Desert